|}

The Fortria Chase is a Grade 2 National Hunt steeplechase in Ireland which is open to horses aged five years or older. It is run at Navan over a distance of about 2 miles (3,219 metres), and it is scheduled to take place each year in November.

The event is named after Fortria, a successful Irish-trained chaser in the late 1950s and early 1960s. It was formerly a handicap race, and it used to be open to horses aged four or older. It was given Grade 3 status in 1993, and its distance was extended by a furlong in 1996. It returned to its previous length in 2000, and at the same time it became a conditions race for five-year-olds and up. It was promoted to Grade 2 level in 2003.

Records
<div style="font-size:90%">
Most successful horse (3 wins):
 Big Zeb – 2009, 2010, 2011

Leading jockey (7 wins):
 Barry Geraghty – Private Peace (1999), Alcapone (2002), Moscow Flyer (2003, 2004), Big Zeb (2009, 2010), Ballyoisin (2018)

Leading trainer (3 wins):
 Willie Mullins -  Annfield Lady (1994), Micko's Dream (2001), Twinlight (2014) 
 Colm Murphy -  Big Zeb (2009, 2010, 2011)

</div>

Winners since 1988

See also
 Horse racing in Ireland
 List of Irish National Hunt races

References
 Racing Post:
 , 

 pedigreequery.com – Fortria Chase – Navan.''

National Hunt races in Ireland
National Hunt chases
Navan Racecourse